Arthur Buckler (24 April 1882 – 19 March 1921) was a Welsh professional rugby league footballer who played in the 1900s and 1910s. He played at representative level for Wales, and at club level for Salford, as a forward (prior to the specialist positions of), during the era of contested scrums.

Background
Arthur Buckler's birth was  registered in Newport district, Wales, and his death aged 38 was registered in Newport district, Wales.

International honours
Arthur Buckler won a cap for Wales while at Salford in 1908 against England.

Genealogical information
Arthur Buckler was the younger brother of the rugby league footballer; Herbert Buckler.

References

1882 births
1921 deaths
Rugby league players from Newport, Wales
Rugby league forwards
Salford Red Devils players
Wales national rugby league team players
Welsh rugby league players